Bernardo de Iriarte (18 February 1735, Puerto de la Cruz–13 July 1814, Bordeaux) was a Spanish politician and diplomat.

Biography
He was brother of Tomás de Iriarte y Oropesa

He was a member of the Royal Spanish Academy.

He was a friend of Francisco Goya, and was responsible for some of the names given to Goya's Black Paintings.

Sources

People from Puerto de la Cruz
Spanish diplomats
Politicians from the Canary Islands
1735 births
1814 deaths
Deaths in France